Robert Ivanovich Horvat (born February 17, 1969, Turia Remety, Perechyn District, Transcarpathia) is a Ukrainian politician. People's Deputy of VIII and IX convocations. Deputy group Dovira. Chairman of the Subcommittee on Legal Support of Customs Bodies of the Verkhovna Rada Committee on Finance, Tax, and Customs Policy.

Co-chair of the group for inter-parliamentary relations with the Czech Republic, head of the group for inter-parliamentary relations with Egypt.

Education 
2009 - graduated from the Uzhhorod Training Center of Kyiv University of Trade and Economics and received a full higher education in "Accounting and Auditing".

Politics 
A member of the Dovira parliamentary group, he was previously a member of the Poroshenko Bloc faction.

Khorvat and three other Dovira faction members (Valerii Lunchenko, Vasyl Petiovka and Vladislav Poliak) developed the local Zakarpattia Oblast party Native Zakarpattia. This part won 12 of the 64 seats in the Zakarpattia Oblast Council during the 2020 Ukrainian local elections.

References 

Living people
1969 births
Eighth convocation members of the Verkhovna Rada
Ninth convocation members of the Verkhovna Rada